Veikko Aleksanteri Heiskanen (23 July 1895, in Kangaslampi – 23 October 1971, in Helsinki) was a famous Finnish geodesist.

He is mostly known for his refinement of the theory of isostasy by George Airy and for his studies of the global geoid.

1931–1949 Professor of Geodesy, Helsinki University of Technology
1933–1936 Member of Finnish Parliament
1949–1961 Director, Finnish Geodetic Institute
1951–1961 Research professor, Ohio State University

External links
Veikko Heiskanen and Helmut Moritz (presentation)

1890s births
1971 deaths
Finnish geodesists
Ohio State University faculty
Finnish expatriates in the United States